Derick Roberson (born November 15, 1995) is an American football linebacker for the Houston Roughnecks of the XFL. He played college football at Sam Houston State.

Professional career

Tennessee Titans
Roberson was signed by the Tennessee Titans as an undrafted free agent on May 9, 2019. He was waived on August 31, 2019, and was signed to the practice squad the next day. Roberson was promoted to the active roster on October 19, 2019, but was waived three days later and re-signed back to the practice squad. He was promoted to the active roster again on November 26, 2019. During a Week 16 38-28 loss to the New Orleans Saints, Roberson recorded his first two career sacks on Drew Brees. In the regular-season finale against the Houston Texans, he recorded three tackles and a sack in the 35-14 road victory.

On September 28, 2021, Roberson was placed on injured reserve on September 28, 2021. He was activated on November 16.

Houston Texans
On September 8, 2022, Roberson was signed to the Houston Texans practice squad. He was released from the practice squad on November 7, 2022.

Houston Roughnecks
The Houston Roughnecks selected Roberson in the second round of the 2023 XFL Supplemental Draft on January 1, 2023.

NFL statistics

Regular season

Postseason

References

External links
Sam Houston State Bearkats bio

1995 births
Living people
Players of American football from San Antonio
American football linebackers
Sam Houston Bearkats football players
Tennessee Titans players
Houston Texans players
Houston Roughnecks players